Pooja Bhatt (born 24 February 1972) is an Indian film director, actress, voice over artist and film maker. Born into the Bhatt family, she is the daughter of Indian filmmaker, Mahesh Bhatt. Bhatt played her first leading role in Mahesh Bhatt's television film Daddy in 1989. For the film, she won the Filmfare Award for Lux New Face of the Year for Best Female Debut.

Early life
Pooja Bhatt was born on 24 February 1972 to Mahesh Bhatt and Kiran Bhatt (born Loraine Bright). On her father's side, Bhatt is of Gujarati descent and on her mother's side, she is of English, Scottish, Armenian, and Burmese ancestry. She is the step-daughter of Soni Razdan. She has a brother, Rahul Bhatt and half-sisters Shaheen and Alia Bhatt. Her cousins are Hitarth Bhat and Emraan Hashmi.

Career
Bhatt made her acting debut at age 17, in 1989 with Daddy, a TV film directed by her father Mahesh Bhatt. In the film she portrayed a soul-searching teenage girl in an estranged relationship with her alcoholic father, played by actor Anupam Kher.

Her biggest solo hit and her big screen debut came with the musical hit Dil Hai Ke Manta Nahin (1991), which was a remake of the Oscar-winning Hollywood classic It Happened One Night. Pooja Bhatt appeared in many bold shoots like Stardust.

Her most well-known films in the 1990s included Sadak opposite Sanjay Dutt (1991), Junoon, Jaanam, and Phir Teri Kahani Yaad Aayee opposite Rahul Roy, Sir (1993) and Guneghar (1995) opposite Atul Agnihotri, Tadipaar (1993) and Naaraaz (1994) opposite Mithun Chakraborty, Hum Dono opposite Rishi Kapoor, Angrakshak opposite Sunny Deol (1995), Chaahat opposite Shah Rukh Khan (1996), Tamanna (1997), the super-hit and multi-starrer Border (1997) and Zakhm (1998), opposite Ajay Devgan. 

Her last film appearance was in the English language film Everybody Says I'm Fine! in 2001. She has since focused on producing and directing. She made her directorial debut with Paap in 2004, starring John Abraham and Udita Goswami. Since then, she has made four more directorial ventures: Holiday (2006), Dhokha (2007), Kajraare (2010) and Jism 2 (2012).

In 2020, Bhatt returned to acting with Sadak 2, a sequel to the hit 1991 film. Her father returned to directing with this film after 20 years. It was released on 28 August 2020 on the streaming platform Disney+ Hotstar.

In 2021, Bhatt will be seen in the Alankrita Shrivastava directed upcoming webseries Bombay Begums. It will also feature Amruta Subhash, Shahana Goswami, Plabita Borthakur and Aadhya Anand.

Filmography

Acting roles

Awards and recognitions

References

External links

 
 
 

1972 births
Living people
Actresses from Mumbai
Film directors from Mumbai
Film producers from Mumbai
Businesswomen from Maharashtra
Indian film actresses
Indian web series actresses
Indian voice actresses
Indian women film directors
Indian women film producers
Pooja
Gujarati people
Actresses in Hindi cinema
Actresses in Tamil cinema
Hindi film producers
Hindi-language film directors
Producers who won the Best Film on National Integration National Film Award
Producers who won the Best Film on Other Social Issues National Film Award
Actresses of European descent in Indian films
Indian people of Armenian descent
Indian people of Burmese descent
Indian people of English descent
Indian people of Scottish descent
Filmfare Awards winners
20th-century Indian actresses
21st-century Indian actresses
21st-century Indian film directors
|}
|}